A variant of eccrine spiradenoma which can be multiple on the scalp and can  coalesce to form a 'Turban' tumour. In pathology, a cylindroma is a tumour with nests of cells that resemble a cylinder in cross section.

Types include:

Dermal eccrine cylindroma, a benign tumour of the skin
Adenoid cystic carcinoma, a malignant tumour of the salivary gland

See also 
 CYLD cutaneous syndrome
 List of cutaneous neoplasms associated with systemic syndromes

External links 

Epidermal nevi, neoplasms, and cysts